Angus Abranson is a game designer, publisher and poet who has worked primarily on role-playing games.

Career
Angus Abranson started playing AD&D in 1984, and by the age of 14 he was working for Leisure Games - one of the top game retailers in London. In the late 1980s and the early 1990s, Abranson was also writing for Adventurer (1986-1987) and other British RPG magazines and was one of the forces behind the foundation of the magazine Valkyrie in 1994 and regularly reported news, reviews and editorial for Valkyrie afterward.

Abranson was one of a team of London-based UK Roleplaying industry professionals, including James Wallis, Simon Rogers and others, who grouped together to resurrect the "Dragonmeet" convention in 2000. Abranson brought Dragonmeet outright in 2005 and subsequently merged Dragonmeet with Cubicle 7 in 2009.

By 2003 Abranson was the flatmate of Dave Allsop, and they decided to form a new role-playing company called Cubicle 7. Their first priority was Allsop's SLA Industries, so Abranson announced a publishing schedule of five SLA Industries books for 2004, and by the start of the year he had the first two in layout. Abranson and Dominic McDowall-Thomas were friends who regularly gamed and clubbed together, and he agreed to help edit the SLA Industries books for Abranson. In late 2006, Abranson and McDowall-Thomas properly formed Cubicle 7 Entertainment Limited, with the two of them as partners. Abranson and McDowall-Thomas handed the creation of Victoriana to Ian Sturrock and Andrew Peregrine, as they remained focus on the business side of things. Abranson recruited Chris Birch to write Starblazer Adventures. After acquiring the Doctor Who license, Abranson and McDowall-Thomas needed investment by the end of 2008, and went to Matthew Sprange of Mongoose Publishing who introduced them to the Rebellion Group. Abranson and McDowall-Thomas were then able to go full-time for the first time in March 2009, and as a result Abranson left Leisure Games. Cubicle 7 began partnering with other companies, many of the over 20 companies thanks to Abranson's long-time connections within the industry.  Cubicle 7 also acquired a number of licenses such as Charles Stross's The Laundry Files and Lord of the Rings. The Cubicle 7 print partnerships were not as successful as hoped, reportedly having a "disastrous effect on the company's cashflow", and in November 2011 Abranson left Cubicle 7 to form Chronicle City. He continued the print partnership model at Chronicle City, while Cubicle 7 largely abandoned it,

Abranson went on to partner with long time associate James Desborough, who was appointed creative director at Chronicle City in 2013.

Whilst at Cubicle 7, Abranson, along with Fred Hicks of Evil Hat Productions, Arc Dream Publishing, Cellar Games, Pelgrane Press, and Rogue Games founded the Bits and Mortar Retailer Initiative in 2010.

Abranson has been a guest at a number of gaming conventions around the world, most significantly a Gen Con Industry Insider Guest in 2013, Origins Game Fair Special Guest in 2011, and UK Games Expo where he was also part of the UK Games Expo Dragons Den in 2014.

In 2016 Abranson was appointed business director at EN Publishing.

Abranson has written, or contributed to, a number of role-playing game book and magazines, such as Hillfolk by Pelgrane Press and Cabal by Corone Design.

Abranson had a poetry anthology published through Winter House Press called Wild Card Symphonies in 2017.

References

External links
 Angus Abranson :: Pen & Paper RPG Database archive

Living people
Place of birth missing (living people)
Role-playing game designers
Year of birth missing (living people)